Dittrich is a variant of the German name Dietrich. It occurs as a surname of ethnic Germans in  Silesia. Notable people with the surname include:

Barbara Dittrich (born 1964), American politician
Boris Dittrich (born 1955), Dutch politician and human rights activist
Denise Dittrich (born 1957), American Democratic politician
 Franz Dittrich, Austrian pathologist
 Klaus Dittrich, German computer scientist
 Olli Dittrich, German actor and comedian
 P. Dittrich (fl. 1880–1918), first German photographer to establish himself in Egypt
 Paul-Heinz Dittrich (1930–2020), German composer and academic teacher
 Rudolph Dittrich, German entomologist
 Raik Dittrich, East German biathlete
 Thomas Dittrich (born 1954), German hurdler
 Werner Dittrich (born 1937), German weightlifter
 Wolfgang Dittrich, triathlete

German-language surnames
Surnames of Silesian origin
Surnames from given names